The 2000–01 season was the 121st season of competitive football by Rangers.

Overview
Rangers played a total of 56 competitive matches during the 2000–01 season.

Rangers went into the season looking to clinch a third consecutive Scottish Premier League title, as well as trying to successfully defend the Scottish Cup, win the League Cup and make an impact in the UEFA Champions League.  Despite further heavy investment in the team, which included paying a record 12 million pound fee for striker Tore Andre Flo in November, Rangers were unable to win the title and finished the season without winning any trophies.

Despite a good start to the season, a 6–2 loss against Celtic in the first Old Firm derby saw the beginning of inconsistent league form for Rangers throughout the rest of the season, including a 3–0 loss at home to Kilmarnock. The loss to Kilmarnock brought a conflict between club captain Lorenzo Amoruso and manager Dick Advocaat to a head, resulting in Amoruso being stripped of the captaincy and 22-year-old Barry Ferguson being given the arm band. A 5–1 victory over Celtic in November gave hope for revival but Rangers were unable to put up any serious challenge and finished the season 15 points off top spot.

In the domestic cup competitions Rangers lost 3–1 to Celtic in the semi finals of the League Cup and also surrendered their Scottish Cup crown with a 1–0 loss away to Dundee Utd.

In Europe, Rangers qualified for the group stages of the UEFA Champions League for the second consecutive time after two qualifying rounds and were drawn alongside Sturm Graz, Galatasaray and AS Monaco.  Rangers made a good start to the group with six points from two matches, including a 5–0 win at home to Sturm Graz and 1–0 win away to Monaco. However, they only picked up two points from the remaining four games and failed to qualify for the next phase of the competition, finishing third and therefore dropping into the UEFA Cup. The last match at home to Monaco saw Rangers leading 2-1 which would have seen them go through but a late Monaco goal denied Rangers a place in the next round. In the UEFA Cup Rangers drew Kaiserslautern and despite winning the first leg 1–0 at home, they exited European competition before Christmas after a 3–0 loss in Germany.

Players

Appearances

List of squad players, including number of appearances by competition

|}

Transfers

In

Out

Expendure:  £30,900,000
Income:  £4,200,000
Total loss/gain:  £26,700,000

Results
All results are written with Rangers' score first.

Scottish Premier League

UEFA Champions League

UEFA Cup

Scottish Cup

League Cup

Friendlies

League table

References 

Rangers F.C. seasons
Rangers